I'm in the Band is an American situation comedy series which aired on Disney XD. It ran for two seasons, with a total of 41 episodes airing from November 27, 2009 to December 9, 2011.

Series overview

Episodes

Season 1 (2009–10)

Season 2 (2011)

References 

Lists of American sitcom episodes
Lists of American children's television series episodes
Lists of Disney Channel television series episodes